The 2017 Pittsburgh Riverhounds season was the club's eighteenth season of existence, and their seventh consecutive season in the United Soccer League, the second tier of American soccer. Pittsburgh also competed in the U.S. Open Cup. The season covered the period from September 25, 2016, to the beginning of the 2018 USL season.

The Riverhounds won the Keystone Derby Cup over Harrisburg City Islanders, the second time since the cup was introduced that the Riverhounds won the trophy. After defeating Harrisburg 1–0 on April 29, Pittsburgh went to FNB Field for the last two meetings between the teams, a 0–0 draw on May 24 and a 3–0 Pittsburgh win on August 12.

Pittsburgh finished 13th in the Eastern Conference, missing the playoffs for the second consecutive season and the tenth time in the club's history. Although the Riverhounds increased from 25 to 36 points from 2016 to 2017, they still finished eight points behind Bethlehem Steel FC for the final playoff spot in the conference.

Non-competitive

Preseason

Competitions

USL

Standings

Results summary

Results by round

Match results

U.S. Open Cup

Statistics

Appearances and goals

Disciplinary record
{| class="wikitable sortable" style="text-align: center;"
|-
!rowspan=2| No.
!rowspan=2| Pos.
!rowspan=2| Name
!colspan=2 style="width:85px;"| USL
!colspan=2 style="width:85px;"| U.S. Open Cup
!colspan=2 style="width:85px;"| Total
|-
!  !!  !!  !!  !!  !! 
|-
| 4
| DF
| align=left| Taylor Washington
|7||0||0||0||7||0
|-
| 5
| MF
| align=left| Victor Souto
|5||0||0||0||5||0
|-
| 6
| MF
| align=left| Abuchi Obinwa
|1||0||0||0||1||0
|-
| 7
| MF
| align=left| Stephen Okai
|2||0||0||0||2||0
|-
| 8
| MF
| align=left| Michael Green
|1||0||0||0||1||0
|-
| 9
| FW
| align=left| Chevaughn Walsh
|4||0||0||0||4||0
|-
|10
| MF
| align=left| Kevin Kerr
|1||0||0||0||1||0
|-
| 11
| FW
| align=left| Corey Hertzog
|6||0||0||0||6||0
|-
| 12
| DF
| align=left| Ryan Adeleye
|1||0||0||0||1||0
|-
| 16
| MF
| align=left| Danny Earls
|4||0||1||0||5||0
|-
| 17
| MF
| align=left| Kenroy Howell
|1||0||0||0||1||0
|-
| 20
| DF
| align=left| Jamal Jack
|6||0||0||0||6||0
|-
| 22
| DF
| align=left| Tobi Adewole
|4||0||0||0||4||0
|-
| 25
| MF
| align=left| Marshall Hollingsworth
|1||0||0||0||1||0
|-
| 27
| DF
| align=left| Gale Agbossoumonde
|3||1||0||0||3||1
|-
| 29
| DF
| align=left| Joseph Greenspan
|3||0||0||0||3||0
|-
| 30
| GK
| align=left| Trey Mitchell
|1||0||0||0||1||''0|-
| 36
| FW
| align=left| Romeo Parkes
|1||0||0||0||1||0|}

Transfers
In

Loan in

Out

Recognition

USL Player of the Week

USL Goal of the Week

USL Save of the Week

USL Save of the Month

PostseasonITB Awards Best Win – June 22, 2–0 vs. Tampa Bay Rowdies
 Best Goal – Victor Souto, May 3 vs. Toronto FC II
 Best Kit – Payton's Army Black, worn August 5 vs. Richmond Kickers
 Best Save – Keasel Broome, June 22 vs. Tampa Bay RowdiesCorey Hertzog''' – USL All-League Second Team

Kits

See also
 2017 in American soccer
 2017 USL season

References

Pittsburgh Riverhounds SC seasons
Pittsburgh Riverhounds
Pittsburgh Riverhounds
Pittsburgh Riverhounds